Crepidopterus is a genus of beetles in the family Carabidae, containing the following species:

 Crepidopterus arrowi (Banninger, 1934)
 Crepidopterus cordipennis Fairmaire, 1901
 Crepidopterus decorsei (Fairmaire, 1901)
 Crepidopterus descarpentriesi Basilewsky, 1973
 Crepidopterus geayi Jeannel, 1946
 Crepidopterus goudotii (Guerin-Meneville, 1832)
 Crepidopterus mahaboensis Basilewsky, 1976
 Crepidopterus meridionalis Basilewsky, 1973
 Crepidopterus morosus (Banninger, 1934)
 Crepidopterus pipitzii Fairmaire, 1884
 Crepidopterus seyrigi (Alluaud, 1935)
 Crepidopterus sublevipennis (Alluaud, 1930)
 Crepidopterus sublevis Jeannel, 1946

References

Scaritinae